Aero Dili is an airline from Timor-Leste. It commenced operations on 30 August 2018. The airline has its main hub at the Presidente Nicolau Lobato International Airport in Dili and its fleet comprises one Airbus A320-200, one Cessna 207 and one Cessna 172 aircraft. 

Aero Dili was the first airline in Timor-Leste to be granted an AOC by the Civil Aviation Authority of Timor-Leste (AACTL) to operate domestic operations.

Fleet

See also
 List of airlines of East Timor

References 

Airlines of East Timor
2018 establishments in East Timor
Airlines established in 2018